Tom Ackerman may refer to:
Tom Ackerman (American football) (born 1972), American football center
Tom Ackerman (basketball), American basketball player and coach 
Tom Ackerman, drummer for the American band Sunday's Best